Jaromír Jermář (born 2 October 1956, in Prague) is a Czech historian and politician. He is serving as a Senator in the Senate of the Parliament of the Czech Republic (since 28 October 2006), and is chair of the Senate Committee on Education, Science, Culture, Human Rights and Petitions. He is a member of the Czech Social Democratic Party.

Jermář was a student at Charles University from 1975 to 1980, and earned a doctorate in history in 1983. From 1980, he was employed at the museum in Mladá Boleslav.

References

External links
 Official website

1956 births
Living people
Czech Social Democratic Party Senators
Charles University alumni
Politicians from Prague